Trinity Lutheran Church is a historic Lutheran church located at 390 Hampton Street in Elloree, Orangeburg County, South Carolina.  It was built in 1914, and is a one-story, granite Late Gothic Revival style cruciform plan church building.  The building replaced a wood-frame church built in 1889 that was destroyed by fire in 1913 after being struck by lightning. It features 16 granite and limestone buttresses and distinctive custom limestone arched door and window surrounds.

It was added to the National Register of Historic Places in 2008.

References

Lutheran churches in South Carolina
Churches on the National Register of Historic Places in South Carolina
Gothic Revival church buildings in South Carolina
Churches completed in 1914
20th-century Lutheran churches in the United States
Churches in Orangeburg County, South Carolina
National Register of Historic Places in Orangeburg County, South Carolina